The following is a list of episodes of the television series The Tonight Show Starring Johnny Carson which aired in 1992:

1992

January

February

March

April

May

References

Tonight Show Starring Johnny Carson, The
Tonight Show Starring Johnny Carson, The
The Tonight Show Starring Johnny Carson